The Ambilici (Gaulish: Ambilicoi, 'those around the Licos') were a Gallic tribe dwelling in the valley of Gail river (southern Austria) during the Roman period.

Name 
They are mentioned as Ambílikoi (Ἀμβίλικοι; var. Ἀμβλικοί) by Ptolemy (2nd c. AD).

The ethnic name Ambilici is a latinized form of the Gaulish Ambilicoi, which probably means 'around the Licos', that is 'those living around the Licos river'. The river name itself appears to be derived from lic(c)a ('flat stone'). Alternatively, it can be translated as 'the people on the rock' or 'the people around the cliff', by deriving the second element directly from Gaulish lica.

Geography 
The Ambilici lived around the Licos river (modern Gail). Their territory was located south of the Ambidravi, east of the Laianci, Saevates and Catubrini, north of the Carni.

References

Bibliography 

Historical Celtic peoples
Gauls